Reitoru, or Te Pirehi, is a small atoll of the Tuamotu Archipelago in French Polynesia. It is located in center of the archipelago, 50 km southwest of Hikueru.

The inner lagoon is closed and is inaccessible from the ocean. The total surface area is 1.39 km2. The island is inhabited by a small number of people who live by farming pearls and gathering copra.

History
The first recorded European who arrived to Reitoru Atoll was French Louis Antoine de Bougainville in 1768. The following year, James Cook called the island "Bird Island", because the birds were the only inhabitants found.

During the 19th and 20th century, Reitoru was an important center for pearl divers. In 1903 the atoll was devastated by a cyclone causing the death of approximately one hundred people.

Administration
Administratively Reitoru belongs to the commune of Hikueru, which consists of the atolls of Hikueru, Marokau, Ravahere, Reitoru and Tekokota.

References 

Atoll names

External links
Atoll list (in French)

Atolls of the Tuamotus